Emmanuel Bondeville was a French composer and music administrator, born 29 October 1898 in Rouen, and died 26 November 1987 in Paris. He was a member of the Académie des Beaux-Arts.

Biography 
As a young man he was organist at the church of Saint-Nicaise in Rouen and Notre-Dame in Caen. Bondeville lost both his parents when he was 16, and took on various jobs – organist, bank clerk, translator - to get by. He made his beginnings in music around 1923 writing works for piano, symphonic poems, opéras-comiques and opéras. During this time he also travelled around Europe and worked as an assistant in a music shop. He eventually had lessons in harmony and counterpoint from Jean Déré.
In 1935 he became musical director of the radio stations Radio Tour Eiffel, Radio Paris, Radiodiffusion française then artistic director of Radio Monte-Carlo.

From 1949 to 1951 Bondeville was director of the Opéra-Comique, followed by a similar position at the Opéra de Paris from 1952 to 1969.

He was married three time among which to the mezzo-soprano Viorica Cortez, to whom he dedicated his opera Antoine et Cléopâtre, and later to Dominique Plessis (with whom he broadcast programmes entitled ‘Une saison d'opéra’ on France-Inter)

Works 
 Les Illustrations, symphonic triptych comprising :
 Le Bal des pendus (first performed 6 December 1930 by the Lamoureux Orchestra) 
 Ophélie (1931)
 Marine (1933)
 L'École des maris (opéra-comique after Molière), premiered at the Opéra-Comique on 19 June 1935 conducted by Albert Wolff
 Madame Bovary, drame lyrique after Flaubert, premiered at the Opéra-Comique on 1 June 1951 in a production by Louis Musy, conducted by Albert Wolff, with Jacqueline Brumaire in the title role.
 Illustrations pour Faust, (1942)
 Gaultier-Garguille, symphonic poem, (1951)
 Symphonie lyrique, (1956)
 Symphonie chorégraphique (1961)
 Antoine et Cléopatre, opera (1972) premiered at the Opéra de Rouen in 1974

Titles, honours 
 Commandeur de la Légion d'honneur
 Commandeur de l'Ordre des Arts et des Lettres
 Grand Officier de l'Ordre national du Mérite
 Croix de guerre 1914-1918

References

External links 
Biographie
"M. Emmanuel BONDEVILLE (1898-1987)" – Discours sur sa vie de son successeur à l'académie Serge Nigg. 

1898 births
1987 deaths
20th-century classical composers
20th-century French composers
20th-century French male musicians
French male classical composers
French opera composers
French radio presenters
Male opera composers
Commandeurs of the Légion d'honneur
Commandeurs of the Ordre des Arts et des Lettres
Grand Officers of the Ordre national du Mérite
Musicians from Rouen